Andrew Chalmers (born 1899) was a Scottish professional footballer who played as an inside left.

Career
Born in Girvan, Chalmers played for Dumbarton, Bradford City and Kettering Town. For Bradford City, he made 118 appearances in the Football League, scoring 19 goals; he also made 7 FA Cup appearances.

Sources

References

1899 births
Year of death missing
Scottish footballers
Dumbarton F.C. players
Bradford City A.F.C. players
Kettering Town F.C. players
English Football League players
Association football inside forwards